The Tour of Galicia is an annual cycling race held in Galicia, Spain. It was first held in 1933 and was held a further five times between 1934 and 1984. The tour did not take place from the outbreak of the Spanish civil war in 1936, until the end of the second world war in 1945.
In 1986, it became a regular annual race. The final professional edition of the race was held in 2000. In 2002, after a year's hiatus, the race returned to the calendar as an amateur race.

History 
The first Vuelta a Galicia occurred in 1933 between August 9 and 13.  Villalba's (Vilalba) local newspaper, Faro Villalbés, reported on the race.  There were 33 initial competitors and eight were from the region of Galicia.

The race started in Vigo and the cyclists covered 195 kilometers to Orense, averaging about 31 kilometers per hour.

The second stage started with 29 competitors going from Orense to Lugo covering 125 kilometers and the cyclists averaged about 21 kilometers per hour.

On the third day, the competitors cycled 105 kilometers from Lugo to Ribadeo with the winner of this stage arriving in 3 hours, 18 minutes and 50 seconds.

The next stage, the fourth, the cyclist rode 153 kilometers from Ribadeo to Ferrol, averaging 28 kilometers an hour.  See article for order of arrival by the first 7 cyclists.

In the fifth stage, the cyclists started in El Ferrol, traveled through Jubia (Xubia), Puentes de García Rodriguez, Cabreiros, Villalba (Vilalba), Trasparga Guitiriz, San Julian de Coirós, Betanzos, Espíritu Santo and ending in La Coruña.

On the sixth stage the cyclists rode 237 kilometers from La Coruña to Pontevedra.

In the final stage only 19 cyclists remained, riding 120 kilometers from Pontevedra to Vigo.  The winner was Cardona, finishing at 41 hours, 28 minutes and 5 seconds.  The winning purse was 3,000 pesetas which equates to about $320 dollars, in 1933.

Past winners

References

1933 establishments in Spain
Cycle races in Spain
Men's road bicycle races
Recurring sporting events established in 1933
Sport in Galicia (Spain)